Dusicyon cultridens or Dusicyon patagonicus cultridens  is an extinct canid species in the genus Dusicyon. However, the classification of this species is poorly researched and debatable. Some scientists place this species in the genera Canis and Lycalopex.

Distribution 
Dusicyon cultridens is only known from fossil remains in Argentina. It lived in the Late Pliocene (Uquian in the SALMA classification), from approximately 2.8 to 2.6 million years ago. It was around at about the same time as the rodent Akodon lorenzinii. The fossils were found at cliffs near the Atlantic Ocean, in what is now the coastline of the province of Buenos Aires.

Habitat and characteristics 
Dusicyon cultridens lived in the South American temperate grasslands (pampas). Its size was between that of existing species such as the pampas fox and South American gray fox.

References

External links 
 Ramirez, M. A., Prevosti, F. J.: "Systematic revision of "Canis" ensenadensis Ameghino, 1888 (Carnivora, Canidae) and the description of a new specimen from the Pleistocene of Argentina", Ameghiniana 2014, vol. 51(1), pp. 37–51. URL last retrieved 2018-08-11.

Dusicyon
Pliocene mammals of South America
Uquian
Neogene Argentina
Fossils of Argentina
Fossil taxa described in 1880
Taxa named by Florentino Ameghino